Milia is a community of the Katerini municipality in Greece. Before the 2011 local government reform it was part of the municipality of Petra. The 2011 census recorded 1430 inhabitants in the community.

Administrative division

The community of Milia consists of five separate settlements: 
Ano Milia (population 6)
Karyes (population 187)
Kato Milia (population 869)
Mesaia Milia (population 352)
Fteri (population 16)
The aforementioned populations are as of 2011. The seat of the former municipality of Petra was in Kato Milia.

References

See also
List of settlements in the Pieria regional unit

Populated places in Pieria (regional unit)